The City Turns the Lights On is a 1958 Soviet drama film directed by Vladimir Vengerov.

Plot 
The film tells about the former intelligence officer, Nikolay Mityasov, who as a result of his injury returns to his hometown and learns that his wife Shura has betrayed him. Nikolai is in despair, but everything changes when he meets Valentina...

Cast 
 Nikolay Pogodin as Nikolai Mityasov
 Elena Dobronravova as Valya
 Oleg Borisov as Sergey Yeroshin
 Liliya Aleshnikova as Shura Mityasova
 Pavel Usovnichenko as Khokhryakov
 Yuriy Lyubimov as Alexey Ivanovich Boykov
 Aleksandr Sokolov as Professor Nikoltsev
 Valentin Grudinin as Gromoboy
 Boris Arakelov as Lyovka Khorol
 Alisa Freindlich as Zina Pichikova

References

External links 
 
 Город зажигает огни on Kinopoisk

1958 films
1950s Russian-language films
Soviet comedy films
1958 comedy films